Ami Foster is an American actress and singer. She is best known for her role as Margaux Kramer in the TV series Punky Brewster.

Biography
Foster, a native of California, won the National Tap Dance Championship after which she was discovered on Star Search as a singer at age eight. In 1984, Foster landed her most notable role, in the NBC series Punky Brewster as Margaux Kramer, the spoiled upper class friend of the title character. During the run of Punky Brewster, Foster appeared on Circus of the Stars; she shared an act with actor-musician Corey Yothers, whose sister Tina (of Family Ties fame) was also featured that year in COTS.

Following the end of Punky Brewster in 1988, Foster appeared in various guest roles: on The Wonder Years, Quantum Leap, and Life Goes On. In 1986–87, she was the voice of Holly, the young owner of the Puppy Pound in the Pound Puppies television series. She also voiced Sally Brown in the 1988 animated Peanuts special Snoopy!!! The Musical and Lucy van Pelt in an episode of This Is America, Charlie Brown. In 1989, she had a role in the film Troop Beverly Hills. Foster's last role before taking an extended hiatus was in a 1995 episode of CBS Schoolbreak Special. In 2021, she returned to acting and reprised her role as Margaux Kramer in the Punky Brewster season 5 revival of the series in a guest appearance.

Personal life
 
Foster married Santa Ana firefighter Trenton DeFries in 2001. They have two children.

Foster has one brother, Shawn Foster, a Grammy-winning music video, television, and film director.

Filmography

Awards and nominations

References

External links

Living people
20th-century American actresses
20th-century American singers
21st-century American actresses
21st-century American singers
American child actresses
American child singers
American film actresses
American television actresses
American voice actresses
People from California
Place of birth missing (living people)
Singers from California
Year of birth missing (living people)